Lucanus formosanus is a stag beetle which is endemic to Taiwan, and grows to a length of . Like other species in the Lucanid family, L. formosanus exhibits distinct sexual dimorphism and subsequent external morphological allometry in males. Males of the species develop mandibles of various forms depending on geographic location; i.e. northern, central, and southern morphs.

References

formosanus
Beetles of Asia
Endemic fauna of Taiwan
Insects of Taiwan
Beetles described in 1899